Didymoglossum is a tropical genus of ferns in the family Hymenophyllaceae. It comprises more than 30 epilithic or low-epiphytic species under two subgenera. The genus is accepted in the Pteridophyte Phylogeny Group classification of 2016 (PPG I), but not by some other sources which sink it into a broadly defined Trichomanes.

Taxonomy
The genus Didymoglossum was first described by Nicaise Auguste Desvaux in 1827. Its status, like other genera in the subfamily Trichomanoideae, remains disputed. The Pteridophyte Phylogeny Group classification of 2016 (PPG I) accepts the genus, placing it in the subfamily Hymenophylloideae and saying that there are about 30 species. , the Checklist of Ferns and Lycophytes of the World listed 55 species, whereas Plants of the World Online sank the genus into Trichomanes.

Subgenera and species

Subgenus Didymoglossum
Subgenus  is mainly neotropical, with about 20 species, which include:

Subgenus Microgonium
Subgenus  is mainly paleotropical with more than 10 species, which include:

References

Hymenophyllales
Fern genera